Apiognomonia is a genus of fungi in the family Gnomoniaceae. The genus contains 10 species.

References

External links
Apiognomonia at Index Fungorum

Gnomoniaceae
Sordariomycetes genera
Taxa named by Franz Xaver Rudolf von Höhnel